Braintree is a town and former civil parish in Essex, England. According to the 2021 Census, the town had a population of 43,492, while the urban area, which includes Great Notley, Rayne, Tye Green and High Garrett, had a population of 55,792.

Braintree has grown contiguously with several surrounding settlements. Braintree proper lies on the River Brain and to the south of Stane Street, the Roman road from Braughing to Colchester, while Bocking lies on the River Blackwater and to the north of the road. The two are sometimes referred to together as Braintree and Bocking, and on 1 April 1934 they formed the civil parish of that name, which is now unparished. In 1931 the parish had a population of 8912.

Braintree is bypassed by the modern-day A120 and A131 roads, while trains serve two stations in the town, at the end of the Braintree Branch Line.

Braintree is twinned with Pierrefitte-sur-Seine, France, and gives its name to the towns of Braintree, Massachusetts and Braintree, Vermont, in the United States.

Toponym
The origin of the name is obscure. Braintree was also called "Branchetreu" in the Domesday Book. Another variation can be seen in various Medieval Latin legal records, where it appears as "Branktre". In many early American Colonial documents, it is referred to as Branktry.

One theory is that Braintree was originally Branoc's tree, Branoc apparently being an ancient name. Another theory is that the name is derived from that of Rayne, which was actually the more important settlement in Norman times. A third theory is that the name means "settlement by the river Bran or Braint". The name "Braint" is well attested as a river name in Britain; there is a river of that name in Anglesey, and it may be conjectured that it was the name of the Blackwater in pre-Saxon times, although the Celtic name "Bran" is also used widely for rivers (derived from the British word for a crow and thought to refer to the dark or crow-black appearance of such a river, making it a good fit for a river now called "Blackwater"). The suffix to either Braint or Bran is the Common Brittonic word tre widely found in Wales and Cornwall, but also noted in other town names such as Daventry, with the meaning, initially, of a farm or settlement and later a town.

History

Braintree dates back over 4,000 years when it was just a small village. People in the area during the Bronze and Iron Ages built houses on the lower part of the town, near the River Brain, known as the Brain Valley. This area was later inhabited by the Saxons, who occupied the town after the Romans left and named the Roman road Stane Street (i.e. stone road), a name it still bears. Most notable road names in Braintree now coincide with names of people who fought for the town, and locals living there, such as Aetheric Road (a notable Saxon nobleman who died in the Battle of Maldon in 991, and subsequently left most of the land of Braintree to the Bishop of London, as well as the land of Bocking going to the Prior and monks of Canterbury), Trinovantian Way (at one point, the townsfolk were called Trinovantes, who were around during the Iron Age, and could till the light sandy soil and hunted animals in the surrounding woodland). Other road names reflect places that have since been built on, such as Coldnailhurst Avenue (a farm at the top of the current road on Panfield Lane), Becker's Green Road (opposite a field called Becker's Green), Mark's Farm residential estate (based at the site of an old farm where a Tesco store is now situated), and Fairfield Road (directly in the centre of the present town, named after Fair Field at the same site.)

Roman invasion

When the Romans invaded they built two roads; a settlement developed at the junction of these roads, but was later abandoned when the Romans left Britain. Pilgrims used the town as a stopover and the size of the town increased, leading the Bishop of London to obtain a market charter for the town in 1190.

Flemish cloth trades

As early as the 14th century, Braintree was processing and manufacturing woollen cloth, a trade it was involved with until the late 19th century. The town prospered from the 17th century when Flemish immigrants made the town famous for its wool cloth trade. They took the then current manufacturing methods to a finer detail, and the main markets for the production in the Braintree area were mainly abroad, notably in Spain or Portugal. In 1665, the Great Plague killed 865 out of the population of just 2,300 people.

Silk manufacturing

The wool trade died out in the early 19th century and Braintree became a centre for silk manufacturing when George Courtauld opened a silk mill in the town. Others followed, including Warner & Sons. By the late 19th century, Braintree was a thriving agricultural and textile town, and benefited from a railway connection to London. The wealthy Courtauld family had a strong influence on the town, supporting plans for many of the town's public buildings such as the town hall and public gardens established in 1888. The town's influence on the textile weaving industry is remembered today in the Warner Textile Archive and at Braintree Museum.

Modern history and World War II

During World War II, men from Braintree joined Britain's armed forces, and women were recruited into the town's engineering works or munitions work at Crittalls. Braintree and its surrounding areas were the drop-zone for excess bombs that were left over from raids on London. One particular bomb hit the corner of Bank Street and Coggeshall Road, near the White Hart Inn. The inn stayed intact, but on the opposite side of the road, two buildings were demolished by the bomb.

Since the end of the Second World War, the town centre has become more pedestrianised, with a one-way system moving around the town.

Geography
Essex is rather flat on the whole, and the Braintree area is no exception; however, there is a general downward trend in the height of the ground from the northwest towards the coast to the southeast. Two rivers flow through Braintree in this direction. Pod's Brook becomes the River Brain as it passes under the Roman road, before running through the southern part of Braintree. The River Pant (or Blackwater) runs roughly parallel to it, through the north of Bocking and away to the east of the town. The Brain eventually flows into the Blackwater several miles away, near Witham.

Culture, media and sport

Culture

Braintree's museum, containing displays relating to the history of the town, is named after the local naturalist John Ray and has a number of relatively famous patrons, including the Essex-born artist Jennifer Walter, who was also the youngest ever female Bard of Bath. a The associated Warner Textile Archive contains the second largest collection of publicly owned textiles in the UK (after the Victoria & Albert Museum).

The Braintree Arts Theatre opened in 2009 on the Notley High School campus.

The Bocking Arts Theatre is based at The Literary and Mechanical Institute at the top of Bocking End, and promotes pantomimes, drama and a range of live entertainment events. It is also used extensively for local Community activities including regular NHS Blood Donor Sessions, Record and Stamp/Coin Collectors Fairs, and Charity Fundraising Events. The management of the building is now reliant on unpaid volunteers under the auspices of the Bocking Arts Theatre Charitable Trust. Built in 1863, this Grade II listed building was bequeathed to the citizens of Braintree by George Courtald and his family and celebrated its 150-year anniversary in 2013.

The Braintree and Bocking Carnival takes place each June. The event starts with a procession of floats through the town centre, finishing at Meadowside. Events, including a fair and sideshows, continue throughout the afternoon at Meadowside until around 10 pm.

Sport

Braintree Town Football Club is known as “Pub team from Essex” and “The Iron", and was promoted to the Conference South as champions of the Isthmian League in 2006. The 2006–2007 season saw them just miss out on a second successive promotion to the Conference National. Having finished in third place, they went down 1–0 in the Conference South play-off final. Braintree continued this form during season 2007–2008. After a slow start and a change of first team manager, they took 60 points from their last 30 games to finally secure fifth place and another chance in the play-offs.

This fine form continued in the 2010/2011 season when they won promotion to the Conference Premier as champions. The Football conference is a national competition and the most senior level of non-league football. The Iron in their third season at this level achieved their highest ever season finish in 6th place and just short of a play-off position. Two seasons later 2015/16 saw the "Iron" again reach the first round proper of the FA Cup when they drew Oxford United to Cressing Road and held them to a 1–1 scoreline before bowing out in the replayed match at Oxford. The club also excelled in the league finishing a very credible 3rd place in the 24 club league, this put the team into the play-offs for promotion to the Football league but despite winning the first leg versus Grimsby Town (the eventual winners and promoted team)in North Lincs 1–0, Iron lost 0–2 in the home leg. The match was played in front of 3,200 spectators, the clubs best for 60 years.
In their most recent season Iron after losing their very successful management duo, Danny and Nicky Cowley to fellow leaguers Lincoln City saw their form dramatically fall away to be relegated. Season 2017–18 saw a rebuilt Iron compete in the South Division of the Football Conference. For the most part of the season the team held a play-offs position, eventually finishing 6th. The play-offs were successfully negotiated with wins at Hemel Hempstead, Dartford and in the play-offs final itself against opponents Hampton & Richmond FC. The promotion qualified Iron to again compete at the top tier of non-league football for the 2018/19 season. Iron's fortunes couldn't match that of their earlier stint at Premier level and were relegated back to the Conference South Division after one season.
The Iron have played at the Cressing Road Stadium (off Clockhouse Way) since 1923 when it started out life as Crittals Sports and Athletic Stadium complete with running track.

Braintree Rugby Union Football Club was formed in 1963 by a group of old boys from Margaret Tabor Secondary School and celebrated its 50th anniversary in May 2013. The club is run on a community basis and has a policy of not paying first team players as well as bringing through its own new players from the Minis and Colts Section.

Greyhound racing in Braintree was held at three different venues, at Cressing Road from 1967, at Coggeshall Road from 1930-1932 and at Notley Road during 1932. The racing at all three tracks was independent (not affiliated to the sports governing body the National Greyhound Racing Club) known as flapping tracks, which was the nickname given to independent tracks. The Coggeshall Road site opposite the junction with Marlborough Street opened on 6 September 1930, while the Notley Road site opposite the Angel public house (on land now covered by Kenworthy Road) raced every Monday and Wednesday at 7pm and Saturday at 3pm. The track was operating on 20 February 1932 with races over 475 yards, the proprietor was T H Mooring.

Media

Braintree's local newspaper is the Braintree and Witham Times, whose office is based on High Street. The East Anglian daily times is a regional daily newspaper.

There is a multiplex cinema – Cineworld located alongside the Braintree Village designer centre on the outskirts of the town. Opposite the cinema, there's also a bowling alley and various restaurants and shops. The Town also has numerous public houses and bars both in and around the town centre.

Braintree Musical Society perform two shows a year (in April and October). For 61 years these were performed at The Institute at Bocking End, but in 2012 they moved to a new venue at the Braintree Arts Theatre, part of Notley High School.

The English electronic music band The Prodigy originated in Braintree, and still live in the area, in nearby Harlow.

Education and schools
Braintree has four secondary schools: Gosfield School Independent Co-Educational, Alec Hunter Academy, Notley High School Technology College (which is also the location of the Braintree Sixth Form) and Tabor Academy.

Post 16 education is provided by Gosfield School, Notley High School, The College at Braintree, Braintree Sixth Form and Tabor Academy.
Braintree has a special needs school called The Edith Borthwick School.

Economy, industry and commerce

Braintree has two main market areas that link throughout the town, which are run twice weekly, on a Wednesday and a Saturday. They are based outside the Town Hall in Market Square, and also run along Bank Street and the High Street. The High street is mainly a pedestrianised area, which allows only buses to commute through the town.

Braintree Village, formerly known as Freeport, is a shopping area on the outskirts of Braintree, described as a "designer outlet village". It has approximately 90 departments where designer brands sell surplus stock for lower than the recommended retail price.
It also has its own railway station, namely Braintree Freeport railway station, which is the first stop on the journey from Braintree to London Liverpool Street via Witham.

There are also various industrial centres located around the main Braintree town area, including the Springwood Industrial Estate, Park Drive Industrial Estate and Broomhills Industrial Estate off Pod's Brook Lane. The latter is owned by Sainsbury's and has been dilapidated for renewal for a new superstore that has failed to be given the go ahead.

Transport

Rail
Braintree is served by two railway stations - Braintree and Braintree Freeport.

Both stations are served by hourly Greater Anglia trains on the Braintree branch line. Trains link the town directly to Witham, with some services continuing to London Liverpool Street via Chelmsford and Stratford Monday-Saturday.

At Witham, connecting trains run northbound towards Ipswich, Clacton-on-Sea, Walton-on-the-Naze and Colchester.

Bus
Bus services in Braintree are run by Arriva, First Essex, Hedingham & Chambers, and Stephensons of Essex.

Major routes include 38 (Witham-Braintree-Halstead), 70 (Chelmsford-Braintree-Colchester), 89 (Braintree-Halstead-Great Yeldham) and 133 (Stansted Airport-Braintree-Colchester).

Road

Braintree sits at the junction between the A120 and A131 roads.

The A120 links the town with Bishop's Stortford, Stansted Airport and the M11 for north London and Stratford to the west. Eastbound, the A120 continues to the A12 for Colchester, Ipswich and Harwich International Port.

The A131 links Braintree to Chelmsford and the A12 for east London. Northbound, the road runs to Halstead, Sudbury and Bury St Edmunds. The A1017 for Haverhill meets the road north of the town.

The B1018 links the town to Witham, which sits south-east from Braintree.

The B1053 links nearby Bocking to Finchingfield and Saffron Walden.

The B1256 (old A120) runs to Bishop's Stortford via Great Dunmow.

Roads in Braintree are the responsibility of Essex Highways, except the A120 which is part of the government's strategic highways network, looked after by National Highways.

Cycling 
National Cycle Route 16 passes through Braintree between Bishop's Stortford and Great Totham.

A shared-use path and bridleway runs between Braintree and Takeley on a former railway line - The Flitch Way. The path is a country park for its entire length. It is named after the Dunmow Flitch Trials, a ceremony in which couples who can convince a jury that they have not wished themselves unwed for a year will win a side of bacon.

Main sights

Bocking Windmill, technically a part of Bocking, the windmill stands proud over the countryside at the North end of Braintree & Bocking, having been restored to a degree by the Friends of Bocking Windmill. Although the mill does not work, the majority of the mechanics and infrastructure are still in place. The group running the project hold open days for people to visit, and it can be reached via the Number 38 bus service from Braintree town centre.

The Braintree District Museum is located opposite the Town Hall, along Manor Street, and was originally the Manor Street School. It was built in 1863, to replace the former British School located in the same place. Nowadays, it houses a selection of items showing the history of Braintree and Bocking.

The Braintree & Bocking Public Gardens are situated on the northern side of Braintree, and are close to the District Council offices on Bocking End. They house a garden that was built in 1888, and given to the town of Braintree by Sydney and Sarah Courtauld. There are a set of guidelines for the gardens to keep it in good condition that have been set in place since it opened, and are still governed to this day.

There are several churches around Braintree that may be of interest to people who visit, including St. Michael's along South Street/High Street, St. Mary's Church along Bocking Church Street, St. Peter's church along St. Peter's Road, just off of Bocking End, and Our Lady Queen of Peace Church.

In popular culture
The character Lance Corporal Simon Lansley from the military comedy Bluestone 42 lives in Braintree.

In the book The String of Pearls (mostly known as Sweeney Todd - The Demon Barber of Fleet Street), the magistrate Richard Blunt plays a cattle breeder from Braintree to catch the murderer, in the next-to-last chapter.

Neighbouring villages
Villages in the Braintree area include Bocking, Black Notley, White Notley, Great Notley (a recent construction), Cressing, Felsted, Rayne and Panfield.

Notable people

Henry Adams (1583–1646) – ancestor of US Presidents John Adams (also a Founding Father) and John Quincy Adams; emigrated to the Massachusetts Bay Colony from Braintree around 1638.
Mike Baker (1957–2012) – BBC education correspondent. Grew up in Braintree and wrote a history of the town.
 Beans on Toast (b. 1980) – folk singer. Attended Notley High School and Braintree College.
James Challis (1803–1882) – astronomer, born in Braintree 12 December 1803.
 The Courtauld family – one of the most prominent families of Braintree and Bocking during the 19th century. Their highly successful silk business made them very rich, and provided much employment in the area. They were very major benefactors to Braintree & Bocking, e.g. Town Hall, Corner House, Leahurst Hostel, William Julien Courtauld Hospital, land and buildings for the High School, Public Gardens, Institute.
 Rupert Everett (b. 1959) – actor born in Norfolk in 1959, spent a short time as a child in Braintree and frequented the former Embassy Cinema (now closed and occupied by Wetherspoons).
 Steve Harley (b.1951) – singer/composer and founder of Cockney Rebel, lived in Bradford Street, Braintree, from 1969 to 1971. He worked as a reporter for the Braintree and Witham Times under his real name Stephen Nice. The novelist Jay Merrick, author of Horse Latitudes, worked on the newspaper at the same time under his real name John Thompson.
 Lawrence D. Hills (1911–1990) – founded the Henry Doubleday Research Association headquarters and test site at Bocking, and also developed the Bocking 14 strain of comfrey, which has properties of particular interest to organic gardeners.
 Barry Douglas Lamb (b. 1963) – avant-garde/experimental composer and musician, lived in Braintree from 1989 to 1993 following the demise of The Insane Picnic . Although this appears to have been a period of very little musical output on his part, there is an unofficial recording from the period called "Braintree – the Concubine Harvester".
 Giles Long MBE (b.1976) – triple Paralympic Gold medallist and former World Record holder in the 100m Butterfly, trained with the Braintree and Bocking Swimming Club.
 Olly Murs (b. 1984)– singer and TV personality, was educated at Notley High School.
Next of Kin – pop group who had two top 40 hits in 1999.
Louisa Nottidge (1802–1858) – woman wrongfully detained in a lunatic asylum, whose case was fictionalized by Wilkie Collins in The Woman in White, was born at Fulling Mill House, Bradford Street in 1802.
 Andy Overall (b. 1959) – vocalist, songsmith, performer with '80s band Blue Zoo.
 Katherine Parnell (1846–1921) – younger sister of Sir Evelyn Wood (below), and wife of Irish Nationalist leader, Charles Parnell.
Andrew Phillips, Baron Phillips of Sudbury (b. 1939) – noted politician and lawyer in the field of civil liberties who lived in Bradford Street, Braintree for much of the 1980s.
 The Prodigy – dance music group. The band's leader Liam Howlett was educated at Alec Hunter High School. Howlett caused indignation among some residents when he criticised the town in an interview for the music magazine Q. He reportedly used "an abusive term".
 John Ray (1627–1705) – naturalist, born in nearby Black Notley.
 Louie Spence (b. 1969) – dance expert, choreographer and television personality.
 Sir Evelyn Wood (1838–1919) – field marshal, Victoria Cross recipient.

Further reading
Published histories of Braintree & Bocking include:
May Cunnington & Stephen Warner:'Braintree & Bocking'(1906);
W. F. Quinn: A History of Braintree & Bocking (Lavenham Press, 1981);
Michael Baker: The Book of Braintree & Bocking (Barracuda Books, 1981, Baron Books 1992);
John Marriage: Braintree & Bocking A Pictorial History (Phillimore, 1994).
Joan M Richmond: Nine Letters from an Artist The Families of William Gillard (Porphyrogenitus, 2015). .

References
https://www.citypopulation.de/en/uk/eastofengland/

External links

 Braintree District Council

 
Towns in Essex
Former civil parishes in Essex
Braintree District
Market towns in Essex